Vino de Pago is a classification for Spanish wine applied to individual vineyards or wine estates, unlike the Denominación de Origen Protegida (DOP) or Denominación de Origen Calificada (DOCa) which is applied to an entire wine region. The Vino de Pago classification was introduced in 2003 by a decision in the Cortes Generales, the Spanish parliament, to help further improve the quality of Spanish wine. As of 2021, there were 20 Vinos de Pago.

The quality requirements for a Vino de Pago correspond to those for a DOCa wine, and wine estates that are classified as Vino de Pago are subject to separate requirements rather than those of the wine region where they are located. One of the requirements is that the estate may only use their own grapes for their wines. The Spanish word pago comes from the Latin word pagus, meaning a country district.

When introduced, the new regulation met with particular interest in Castilla-La Mancha, where the first Vinos de Pago were created. So far, all Vinos de Pago are located in Aragon, Castilla-La Mancha, Castilla y León, Navarra and Valencia.

List of Vinos de Pago

References

External links
 Ministerio de Agricultura, Pesca y Alimentación - Ministry of Agriculture, Fishing, and Food (Spain)

Wine regions of Spain
Spanish wine
Appellations
Wine classification